Football in India has historically been among the top 3 most popular sports in terms of players participation and TV viewership, together with long time number one cricket and re-emerging kabaddi. India's current top domestic football league is Indian Super League, formed with eight teams to promote Indian football in the country and the world. The league began in 2014 and after third season, it was recognised by AFC as the national football league, running parallel with the I-League, thus (until 2022) leaving India as one of the few countries ever with two fully recognised top-tier football leagues. Also contested in Santosh Trophy, a knock-out competition between states (provinces) and government institutions.

The 2017 FIFA U-17 World Cup was hosted by India in the month of October in 2017, the first time the country hosted a FIFA event. The tournament was touted as the most successful FIFA U-17 World Cup ever, with the attendance being a record 1,347,133 surpassing China's 1985 edition where it was 1,230,976. India also hosted the 2022 FIFA U-17 Women's World Cup. India also bid to host the 2019 FIFA U-20 World Cup, but lost to Poland.

History

Pre independence
The origin of football in India can be traced back to mid-nineteenth century when the game was introduced by British soldiers. Initially, games were played between army teams. However, clubs were soon set up around the country. Calcutta FC was the first club to be established in 1872, though reports suggest that they were initially a rugby club and switched their attentions to football as late as 1894. Other early clubs include Dalhousie Club, Traders Club and Naval Volunteers Club. Several other football clubs like Sovabazar, Mohun Bagan and Aryan Club were established in Calcutta around the 1890s. Calcutta, then capital of British India, soon became the hub of Indian football. Tournaments like Gladstone Cup, Trades Cup and Cooch Behar Cup was also started around this time. The Durand Cup and IFA Shield were both started in late nineteenth century.

The first Indian team to achieve success was Sovabazar Club, which won the Trades Cup in 1892. Mohun Bagan Athletic Club was set up in what is now West Bengal in 1889. The club became famous in 1911 when it became the first Indian team to lift the IFA Shield, a tournament previously won only by British teams based in India. It defeated the East Yorkshire Regiment 2–1 in the final of the tournament in a victory that is still regarded by many as the greatest win by an Indian team before Independence.

The Indian Football Association (IFA) was established in Calcutta in 1893, but did not have a single Indian on its board until the 1930s. The All India Football Federation, which runs the game in India, was formed in 1937, but took more than a decade to get affiliated with FIFA. India also insisted on playing barefoot when other nations were putting their boots on and the game was changing fast. Legendary footballer Jyotish Chandra Guha earned global attention for Indian football when he became first Indian to appear with English Football League club Arsenal in 1930.

The golden age
India qualified by default for the 1950 FIFA World Cup as a result of the withdrawal of all of their scheduled opponents. But lack of financial assistance to purchase tickets including the prospects of a very long sea journey meant that the team never made it to Brazil. FIFA had imposed a rule banning barefoot play following the 1948 Olympics where India had played barefoot. The myth that Indians refused to play because they were not allowed to play barefoot is not entirely true, according to the then Indian captain Shailen Manna, it was just a story to cover up the disastrous decision of the AIFF. The team has never since come close to qualifying for the World Cup.

India even picked up the gold medal in football in the first Asian Games in 1951, beating a "booted" Iran by a solitary goal. In 1956, after having put on its boots, India reached the semi-final in Melbourne Olympics football, the first Asian country to do so. It stood fourth in the tournament. In 1962, India again picked up the football gold in the Asian Games. 1951–1962 is usually considered as "golden phase" of Indian football. The National team won numerous titles in this era under the coaching of Syed Abdul Rahim. Other than success in Asian Games football, India also won Merdeka Cup and Quadrangular Tournament while East Bengal garnered rave reviews after its tour of Romania. It is during this period that India achieved their highest World Football Elo Ratings of 31 in 1951. Rahim's death in the early 1960s pegged Indian football back after a successful period. The former FIFA president Sepp Blatter once famously said that India is "the sleeping giant of world football".

The decline
India never qualified for the Olympics after 1960. India did qualify for its first Asian Cup in 1964 but failed to capture the title. India's last important performance in an international tournament came in 1970 Asian Games, when it won the bronze medal by defeating Japan 1–0, however the Indian youth team jointly won the Youth Asian Cup with Iran in 1974, the first and only title for India at youth level. For the club football, 24 September 1977 was a golden day as Mohun Bagan managed to hold on for a memorable 2–2 draw at the legendary Eden Gardens stadium in Calcutta, against a Pele led New York Cosmos. Mohun Bagan would have gone on and won the tie, had it not been for a controversial penalty awarded to the visitors that ensured the spoils were shared. The next day, the Ananda Bazar Patrika described Goutam Sarkar as "India's very own Beckenbaur". Indian national team qualified for the 1984 AFC Asian Cup for the first time since 1964, but failed to qualify for knockout stage as they finished last in their group of five teams. After a golden phase in 50s and 60s, Indian football went through a barren phase in 70s, 80s and 90s, gradually losing its foothold as a top Asian team.

However, things were just getting started for the women's team as they began playing in 70s. The first manager was Sushil Bhattacharya, in 1975. Indian women's team went on to finish as runners-up in 1980 and 1983 editions of AFC Women's Asian Cup. Later in the 90s, the women's team declined rapidly and a series of defeats with heavy margins followed. In 2009, the women's team reached its all-time low as they were delisted by FIFA in world rankings.

In August 2007, the Indian national team won the Nehru Cup for the first time in its history beating Syria 1–0. In August the following year, India defeated Tajikistan 4–1 to lift the AFC Challenge Cup and in turn qualified for the 2011 AFC Asian Cup in Qatar. In August 2009, India again won the Nehru Cup beating Syria on penalties (6–5).

2011–present
In January 2011 India played in the 2011 Asian Cup which was the first time India has played in the Asian Cup for 24 years. India were knocked out in the group stage which contained South Korea, Australia, and Bahrain.

Ever since the 2011 Asian Cup the All India Football Federation has been working very hard on Indian Football. For instance they allowed former coach Bob Houghton coach the Indian side in the 2012 AFC Challenge Cup qualifiers. After going first in there AFC Challenge Cup group Bob Houghton was sacked and replaced by Wim Koevermans. Meanwhile, the India national under-23 football team won the first round of the 2012 Olympics qualifiers against Myanmar but were knocked out by Qatar. India played their next official matches against United Arab Emirates in the 2014 FIFA World Cup qualifiers which India lost on aggregate 5–2.

In 2014, India hosted the first-ever Unity World Cup in Goa, Hyderabad and Bangalore. India has participated in the FIFA U-17 World Cup as hosts of 2017 edition of the tournament. This was the first time ever that a team representing India participated in the finals of a FIFA-organised world tournament. India was placed in Group A along with U.S.A, Ghana and Columbia. On 6 October 2017, India played their first ever match in FIFA U-17 World Cup history in front of 47,000 people against the United States. But unfortunately, India lost the match by 3–0. India played their Second match against Colombia. In 82nd minute Jeakson Singh became the first Indian goal scorer in the finals of any FIFA organised tournaments. For the third match of group stage, India faced Ghana where they went down to lose 4–0, finishing bottom of the group A.

In 2018 Indian youth football teams created history by defeating Argentina U20 2–1 on Cotif Cup, and Iraq U16, the defending champions of AFC U-16 Championship, by 1–0. The U-16 team qualified for the 2018 AFC U-16 Championship where they came close to qualify for 2019 FIFA U-17 World Cup, but went down to South Korea by solitary goal in quarterfinals. Indian senior national team qualified for the 2019 edition Asian Cup after missing out in 2015. In that tournament, India beat Thailand by 4–1; their biggest ever win at the Asia Cup, and their first in 55 years. Nevertheless, they lost both of their next two group matches against UAE and Bahrain by 0−2 and 0−1 respectively and finished at the bottom of the group, thus failed to move to knock out stage.

Administration
The game in India is administered by All India Football Federation (AIFF), which is affiliated with regional Asian Football Confederation, as well as the worldwide body FIFA. The Indian national team has entered into the regional Asian Cup but has never competed in any World Cup. Indian women's national team has also played in various competitions; moreover, women's football has its own separate inter-state and state competitions. Youth football is administered by the governmental Sports Authority of India.

National team

The India national football team is the national football team of India and is governed by the All India Football Federation. It is a member of the Asian Football Confederation. Since 1948, the AIFF has been affiliated with FIFA, the international governing body for world football. In 1954, AIFF became one of the founder members of the Asian Football Confederation (AFC).

At the peak of its success during the 1950s and 60s, the team was automatically advanced to play in the 1950 FIFA World Cup (all the other Asian teams withdrew), but ultimately they did not go to the tournament in Brazil due to the cost of travel, lack of practice time, team selection issues, the issue of the AIFF valuing Olympics over the World Cup, and, unusually, their insistance on playing barefoot when FIFA required all players to wear football boots.  They won gold medals at two Asian Games, and held the record for the best performance by an Asian football team at the Olympics.

There are also a number of other national teams from the Under-23 team to the Under-17 team, the under-23's is considered to be a feeder team for the national team.

Performance
The following list includes the performance of all the national teams of India at major completions.

Men's senior team

The Indian senior national team had several success during the initial years, but as the decades passed the team was no longer one of the best in Asia. The best ever achievement of this team was to win two gold medals at the Asian Games.

Women's senior team

Relative to their male counterparts, the women's team started very late in the 70s. The team had seen success during the initial years in the form of being Asian Women's championship runners-up twice in the early 80s. The later decade when AIFF took incharge of the team, it suffered massive defeats and went down to all-time low during late 2000s. The team was then revived by AIFF and was provided with jaw-dropping number of quality friendlies during the late 2010s in an attempt to empower women's football. The AIFF had also successfully won the 2022 AFC Women's Asian Cup hosting bid.

Men's U-23 team

Men's U-20 team

Includes U-19 and U-18 team's performance.

Men's U-17 team

Includes U-16 and U-15 team's performance.

Women's U-20 team

Includes U-19 and U-18 team's performance.

Women's U-17 team

Includes U-16 and U-15 team's performance.

Club competitions
India currently has three national level leagues. Indian Super League is the top tier league, followed by I-League and I-League 2 (from 2022). The I-League 2 currently acts as a virtual final round for the top teams in the state leagues that are nominated by the State football associations. Besides leagues, India also has several cup tournaments, the notable ones include Durand Cup, Super Cup and IFA Shield.

Evolution in tier system

Leagues

Level I

National Football League (1996–2007)
Founded in 1996, the National Football League was the first football league of India to be organised on a national scale. The aim was to develop the sport in the country and give a platform for Indian footballers to showcase their talent. But due to several problems the league was defunct to make way for a new professional I-League.

I-League (2008–2019)
After the end of 2006-07 season, AIFF disbanded the NFL after missing the aim of professionalism. Supportive to this decision was
also the presence of poor infrastructure and financially weak clubs. To replace NFL, AIFF introduced a fully professional I-League, with ten clubs from the last season of NFL participating in the maiden season of I-League. The league was declared as joint top tier in 2019–20 season when AFC approved AIFF's proposal to demote the AFC Champions League slot of the league to a virtual knockout competition for the AFC Cup slot. Three seasons later, the league was completely demoted to second tier status in Indian football with the league champions now promoted to the Indian Super League.

Indian Super League (2019–present)
The I-League, which was promised to be a professional league, soon began to suffer from lack of popularity due to poor marketing as the seasons passed by. The deal between Zee Sports and AIFF which was initially signed for a ten-year term in 2006 was terminated in 2010 after disagreement between both the parties. AIFF then signed a massive 700-crore deal with Reliance Industries and the International Management Group on 9 December 2010. The Indian Super League was officially launched on 21 October 2013 by IMG–Reliance, Star Sports, and the All India Football Federation with an aim of growing the sport of football in India and increasing its exposure in the country, this time with the big names and high professionalism. A total of eight franchises were bought by big corporations, Bollywood stars and cricketers.

In 2017, The AFC were against allowing the ISL as the main league in India while I-League clubs East Bengal and Mohun Bagan wanted a complete merger of the ISL and I-League. A couple weeks later, the AIFF proposed that both the Indian Super League and I-League should run simultaneously on a short–term basis with the I-League winner qualifying for the AFC Champions League and the ISL champion to AFC Cup qualification stage. The proposal from the AIFF was officially approved by the AFC on 25 July 2017, with the ISL replacing the domestic cup competition, the Federation Cup which was a true knockout cup competition.

Two seasons later, the AIFF and AFC met again to determine the roadmap for Indian football. After the meeting, it was announced that the Indian Super League was officially the top-tier league of India with AFC Champions League slot while I-League was now the domestic cup tournament with AFC Cup slot. The AFC also mentioned some of the key recommendations. The first recommendation was to open a pathway for two I-League clubs to enter into the ISL by the end of the 2020–21 season, subject to the criteria being fulfilled. The second recommendation was, allowing the winner of I-League to stand a chance of getting promoted to the ISL with no participation fee, basis fulfilling sporting merit and the national club licensing criteria to be set out by the AIFF starting with the 2022–23 season. In its final recommendation, it was agreed that there would be no relegation in the ISL for now. The introduction of promotion and relegation into the top league would be implemented by the end of 2024–25 season and the existence of two parallel leagues will be abolished.

Level II

NFL Second Division (1997–2007)
The NFL's second division was introduced by AIFF in 1997 to supplement the top division. After the 2006–07 season, all the three tiers of NFL were defunct and replaced with I-League and I-League 2nd Division respectively.

I-League 2nd division (2007–2022)
The National Football League's second division was succeeded by the I-League second division in 2008. The State FAs nominated top teams from their respective State leagues to AIFF who then selected the clubs based on criteria. The number of clubs in this league varied each season. Since 2017–18 season, the league saw introduction of I-League reserve sides which weren't eligible for promotion since I-League was then the top division. After I-League lost its top tier status, I-League 2nd division too was demoted to third tier, re-establishing India's third tier since NFL's Third Division in 2006.

I-League (2022–present)
Starting from the 2022–23 season, I-League lost its top-tier status. The champions of the 2022–23 I-League were promoted to the ISL with no participation fee. In its recommendation for 2024–25, it was agreed to fully implement promotion and relegation between the two leagues.

Level III

NFL Third Division (2006)
Ten years after the formation of NFL, a third division was briefly introduced for one season in 2006 The NFL Third Division was the first third division tier football league in India to be organized on a national scale. The league was played from 25 November till 18 December 2006 as a promotional tournament for Indian National Football League Second Division. Five teams were promoted to the second division. Starting from the 2022–23 season, I-League 2 filled the void in the third tier left by NFL Third Division in 2006.

I-League 2 (2022–present)
After demoting I-League to the second tier status in Indian football, its second division i.e., I-League 2nd Division was subsequently demoted to third tier. AIFF renamed the 2nd Division to I-league 2 to avoid disambiguation.

Level IV

Indian State Leagues

There are currently total of 37 state associations (including union territories) affiliated with the AIFF.
These state associations have state leagues affiliated to them. The top teams of state leagues are eligible to apply for the I-League 2. Some state leagues have multiple divisions and a promotion/relegation system between these divisions. Calcutta Football League in West Bengal is the oldest state league and has the highest number of divisions (seven) with promotion/relegation system in place.

Proposed League system – Vision 2047

2023–2026

AIFF has broken down ‘Vision 2047’ into six four-year strategic plans. The first of these will look to cover the period till 2026. According this plan in 2026 Indian football season 40 clubs will participate in ISL(14 clubs), I-League (14 clubs) and I-League-2 (12clubs). Moreover 60 clubs will participate in 5 zonal leagues with minimum 12 teams in each zone. 

How ever AIFF's new strategic plan 2026, the number of teams in the current leagues needs to be increased. By the 2026 season, ILeague-2 will have to be rebranded to a full league format with at least 12 teams with relegation and promotion. In 2026 season onwards State FA league champions won't promote directly to I-League2. SFA champions will promote their respective Zonal league and Then each Zonal league champions will play I-League-2 qualifier.

Regional League and Zonal League

According to Vision 2047, there will be 40 clubs in various national leagues when the first strategic plan is completed by the 2026 season. Also there will be 60 clubs in 5 zonal leagues. Apart from this there will be 300-450 clubs in 30-35 State Football Associations leagues. The state football associations produces 30-35 state champions every season. The proposed system is unable to accommodate these SFA champions. This will pave the way for revamping the zonal league into a new structure.

Regional League

All SFAs under AIFF are divided into 2 regions to form a Regional league below I-League2. The bottom teams in I-League2 will relegate to Regional League and the champions of Regional League will promote to I-League2.

Bottom teams in Regional League will relegate to Zonal league. Zonal League champions will promote to Regional League.

Zonal League
Currently the zones are divided by geographically. North, West,East, South and North-East are the five zones. As per the new system, while zones are divided in proportion to the number of SFAs. According to this, there will be 8/12 zones instead of the current 5 zones. Each season SFA League Champions will be promoted to each Zonal League and teams who finish bottom in Zonal League will be relegated to SFA Leagues.Zonal league champions will be promoted to regional leagues.

2026–2030
According to the Vision 2047 after completing the second strategic plan in 2030 the Indian football structure would be like this.

Cups

Federation Cup
Federation Cup (abbreviated as Fed cup) is an annual knockout style club football tournament in India. It has started in 1977. From its inception till I-League has been started in 1997 (then called NFL), it was the most prestigious national level club football tournament in India. Previously, the winning club of Federation fused to get a chance to compete in the continental level in AFC Cup along with I-League champion team. Presently, the cup has been discontinued since the 2017–18 season and a new Super Cup was inaugurated from the same season and this tournament is the country's top tier cup competition.

Durand Cup
The Durand Football Tournament, commonly known as the Durand Cup, was started by then, India's Foreign Secretary, Mortimer Durand at Simla, India, in 1888, initial matches were played in Dagshai. It was basically initiated, as a recreation for British troops stationed in India. The Durand Cup was twice suspended, during the two world wars. In 1940 the venue was shifted to New Delhi.

Super Cup
The Super Cup is a knockout football tournament. The top six teams from both the top-tier leagues for professional football in India, the I-League and Indian Super League, qualify directly for the main round of the competition. The bottom four clubs from each league participate in qualification round to complete.

IFA Shield
The IFA Shield is an annual football competition organized by the Indian Football Association (IFA), West Bengal. It is the fourth oldest club cup competition in the world (started in 1893) after the FA Cup, the Scottish Cup and the Durand Cup. Along with local clubs of Bengal, clubs all around the nation and even overseas are duly invited to participate in this tournament.

Senior National Football Championship / Santosh Trophy
The Santosh Trophy, also known as the Senior National Football Championship, is an annual Indian football tournament which is contested by states and government institutions. The trophy is named after the late Maharaja Sir Manmatha Nath Roy Chowdhary of Santosh. The first winners were Bengal, who also lead the all-time winners list with 32 titles till date.

Overview
The competitions currently active in Indian football.

Qualification for Asian competitions

Women's football

Women's football has not had the relative head start over the rest of the world that the men's game has had, and also has not had the chance to spread through the country like its male counterpart. The game was administered by the Women's Football Federation of India (WFFI) from 1975 until the early 1990s when they were absorbed into the AIFF. However, there are complaints that women's football is treated as a poor relation to the men's game leading to (unfulfilled) plans to de-merge the WFFI.

The women's game, like the men's game, also has its early pioneers in the state of West Bengal. The large Kolkata teams, East Bengal and Mohun Bagan, started women's club sides in the 2000–01 season, and they participate with other teams in the Calcutta Women's Football League. However, it has been seen recently that players from Odisha and Manipur have made advances in the game. Players from these two states make up a large part of the India women's national football team.

The women's national competition is played on a state vs. state basis in the India women's football championship. There are also similar national championships for junior teams like the Junior Girls National Championship (for under 19s) and the Under-17 Girls National Championship.

Some female players have become internationally recognised. Among them are Chitra Gangadharan who was selected to play for the All Asian Star team. Jaanki Kotecha was selected as captain to the All Asian Star Team in 2008–09, where she led her team to victory. In February 2000, Sujata Kar and Alpana Sil became the first Indian footballers to sign a contract outside India. They signed with the German team TSV Crailsheim, but had to return after a month due to problems with the clearance of their international transfer.

Until 1983, women's football took part in international tournaments like the AFC Women's Asian Cup. For example, the team won silver in 1980 at Calicut. In later years, it had become poor in status just like its male counterpart. During the 2003 AFC Women's Championship, the Indian team were embarrassed by a 12–0 defeat to China.

The poor support of the national team by the AIFF became evident, when the team's trip to Germany was only made possible by Non Resident Indians in the country, and by the support of the German Football Association. Furthermore, championships are held in remote locations, and national media coverage is said to be restricted to state and local newspapers.

The women's game reached a new low in June 2009 when FIFA delisted the side from its world rankings for being out of action for more than 18 months. This comes at a time when the game was gaining in popularity amongst the younger generation as evident by the local leagues conducted around the country. The recently concluded Mumbai Women's Football League 2009–10 organised by the MDFA (Mumbai District Football Association) was a major success and featured many talented players who had played for the national team. Furthermore, the popularity of the event gave hope that the women's game could rise in India.

Indian Women's League

On 21 April 2016, over a year after the AIFF started plans for a women's football league, the AIFF President, Praful Patel, said that a women's football league would kick off in October 2016 with six teams to be decided, with the goal to expand to eight teams by 2017. Just over two months later, on 5 July 2016, the AIFF organized a workshop to discuss the India women's national team and discuss the proposed women's football league. Five Indian Super League sides (Delhi Dynamos, Chennaiyin FC, Kerala Blasters, FC Pune City, Atletico de Kolkata) and three I-League teams (Bengaluru FC, Aizawl FC, Mumbai FC) attended the workshop. It was announced that the league would feature the eight teams in the league and two other spots would be determined through a pre-qualification round.

On 14 October, the AIFF announced that the preliminary rounds for the Women's League would begin on 17 October 2016 in which ten teams are split into two groups of five teams each, with the winner from each group qualifying for the national finals.

Stadiums
There are many football stadiums in India, however only a few of them are currently of world standards. These are namely the largest stadium in India, the Salt Lake Stadium in Kolkata with a seating capacity of 85,000, Jawaharlal Nehru Stadium in New Delhi with a capacity of over 60,000 and the Ambedkar Stadium with a capacity of 35,000. Barabati Stadium in Cuttack and Kalinga Stadium in Bhubaneswar are two major arenas for football events in Odisha. In Sikkim, the 30,000-capacity Paljor Stadium in Gangtok is famous as one of the most beautiful stadiums in the world as it is situated in the backdrop of Himalayas. In Shillong the main stadium is the Jawaharlal Nehru Stadium with a capacity of 30,000 standing. Both the Paljor and the JLN in Shillong have been renovated and now have artificial playing surfaces. Some other stadiums important stadiums are the Shree Shiv Chhatrapati Sports Complex in Pune, the Barasat Stadium in Barasat, the Fatorda in Goa, the Kaloor International Stadium in Kochi, Municipal Corporation Stadium in Kozhikode, the Jawaharlal Nehru Stadium in Guwahati, the EKA Arena in Ahmedabad. Apart from the above-mentioned stadiums, there are hundreds of more stadiums in the country. The following stadiums are affiliated by All India Football Federation.

International competitions hosted

Nehru Cup
The Nehru Cup was an international invitational association football tournament organised by the All India Football Federation (AIFF), named after the First Prime Minister of India, Jawaharlal Nehru.

Intercontinental Cup
The Intercontinental Cup is a 4-team association football tournament organised by the All India Football Federation (AIFF). The first ediiton was held as Tri-Nation Series as a 3-team association football tournament in 2017.

Indian clubs abroad

International competitions won by Indian clubs/teams

Media

The Indian Super League is officially broadcast on Star Sports network in India. International coverage is done by OneFootball.

Seasons
The following articles detail the major results and events in each season of Indian football since 2011.

See also
 Elite League
 Junior National Football Championship
 List of football clubs in India
 List of Indian players in foreign leagues
 AIFF Player of the Year Awards
 Kolkata derby
 South Indian derby
 Futsal Association of India
 Football in Asia
 Mission XI Million
 Sport in India

References

External links

 BBC Sport – "What's holding back Indian football?"
 "Gender and sport in India: aspects of women's football"
 "Indian Football Association over the ages" (Video)

 
Sport in India